A gentian is a plant that has terminal tubular flowers.

Gentian may also refer to:

Ships
 HMS Gentian (K90), a Royal Navy Flower-class corvette
 USCGC Gentian (WIX-290), a Cactus-class seagoing buoy tender

People
Gentian (given name)
Saint Gentian (died 287), French Christian martyr

Other uses
 Gentian violet, a dye and antifungal agent
 Gentian liqueur, a distilled alcoholic beverage
 Gentian, Michigan, a community in the US

See also
 Tulip gentian, Eustoma, a herbaceous annual
 Dwarf gentian, Gentianella
 Gentium (disambiguation)